Herpetogramma cleoropa is a moth in the family Crambidae. It was described by Edward Meyrick in 1934. It is found on the Marquesas Archipelago, where it has been recorded from Hiva Oa.

References

Moths described in 1934
Herpetogramma
Moths of Oceania